The Shakey's V-League 11th Season: 1st Conference is the 19th conference of Shakey's V-League, a collegiate women's volleyball league in the Philippines founded in 2004. The opening ceremonies was held on March 23, 2014 with the first doubleheader of volleyball games at the Filoil Flying V Arena in San Juan. There are 12 teams competing this including the join forces of all the top selected players from Davao in one team (called as Davao Lady Agilas) and the debut of St. Louis University of Baguio. Also, the return of Arellano, Adamson, Ateneo, FEU, San Sebastian, CSB, NU, Perpetual, SWU, and UST. This is league's first time to have 12 participating schools to battle for the championship, and first to have a school representing Mindanao region.

Tournament Format

Preliminaries (PL)
 Twelve (12) participating teams will be divided into two (2) PL groups- Pool A & Pool B.
 Each pool will play a single round robin.
 The TOP 4 TEAMS PER POOL (or a total of eight (8) teams) will advance to the Quarterfinal Round.
 The bottom two (2) per group will be eliminated from the tournament.

Quarterfinals (QF)
 The eight (8) quarter finalists will be regrouped into two (2) new QF Pools- Pool C & Pool D.
Pool C will be composed of Pool A seed #1 (A1) and seed #3 (A3) and Pool B seed #1 (B1) and seed #3 (B3).
Pool D will be composed of Pool A seed #2 (A2) and seed #4 (A4) and Pool B seed #2 (B2) and seed #4 (B4).
 Each QF Pools will play a single round robin, provided that matches will no longer be played between the teams from the same PL Pool.
 For the teams belonging to the same PL pool, their prelims match result will be carried over into the QF. (e.g. if A1 def. A3, 3-0 set in the PL then it will be as if A1 def. A3, 3-0 set in the QF. without a match occurring between them.)
 The TOP TWO (2) TEAMS PER POOL (a total of four (4) teams) will advance to the Semi-final Round.
 The bottom two (2) per group will be eliminated from the tournament.

Semi-finals
 The four (4) semi-finalists will compete against each other in a best-of-three series as follows: C1 vs D2 and D1 vs C2.
 The two (2) SF winners will compete for GOLD.
 The two (2) SF losers will compete for BRONZE.

Finals
 The battle for GOLD and the battle for BRONZE will both follow the best-of-three format, provided:
 If the battle for GOLD ends in two (2) matches (2-0), then there will no longer be Game 3 for either GOLD or BRONZE.
 If, in the case, the series for BRONZE is tied (1-1), then the tie will be resolved using FIVB rules.
 A tie in the series for GOLD (1-1) after Game 2 will be broken in a Game 3, regardless of the results of the series in BRONZE.

Participants 
The conference is composed of 12 teams, grouped into two pools, each consisting of six squads.

Season's Line-ups (Regular Players)

Pool A

Pool B

List of Guest Players

Eliminations

Pool A

|}

Game Results

|}

Pool B

|}

Game Results

|}

Quarterfinals

Pool C

|}

Game Results

|}

Pool D

|}

Game Results

|}

Bracket
* All places are determined by best-of-3 series.

Semifinals

NU vs. UST

Adamson vs. FEU

Finals

Battle for Bronze

Battle for Gold

Final standings

Individual awards

 Season's Most Valuable Player: (C) Aleona Denise Santiago
 Most Improved Player: Shiela Marie Pineda
 Best Scorer: (G) Ennajie Laure
 Best Attacker:(G) Ma. Paulina Soriano
 Best Blocker: Marivic Velaine Meneses
 Best Server: (C) Aleona Denise Santiago
 Best Digger: (L) Dansel Jan Dusaran
 Best Setter: (C) Yna Louise Papa
 Best Receiver: (L) Christine Agno
 Final's Most Valuable Player: (G) Rachel Anne Daquis
Note
 (G) - Guest Player
 (C) - Team Captain
 (L) - Libero

External links
 http://issuu.com/tmxsports/docs/svls11c1-24
 http://issuu.com/tmxsports/docs/svls11c1-19

Shakey's V-League conferences
2014 in Philippine sport
2014 in volleyball